The Test Way is a  long-distance footpath in England from Walbury Hill in West Berkshire to Eling in Hampshire, which follows much of the course of the River Test.

The northern end of the footpath starts in the car park on Walbury Hill.  It passes through the towns of Romsey and Totton and the villages of Linkenholt, Ibthorpe, Hurstbourne Tarrant, St Mary Bourne, Longparish, Forton, Wherwell, Chilbolton, Stockbridge, Horsebridge and Mottisfont. The southern end of the footpath is at Eling Quay.

The trail also passes alongside Horsebridge railway station. Much of the route between Kimbridge and Chilbolton follows the route of the former Andover and Redbridge Railway.

The entire route is waymarked by metal and plastic disks found attached to wooden and metal posts, trees and street furniture.  There are several wooden 'finger' signs along the route that count down the number of miles along the footpath in both directions.

This route is shown as a series of green diamonds on Ordnance Survey 1:25,000 maps and as a series of red diamonds on Ordnance Survey 1:50,000 maps

Walbury Hill is also the start of the Wayfarers Walk.

Places of interest
The following places of interest and hills can be found along the length of the Test Way, listed from Walbury Hill:
 Combe Gibbet
 Ham Hill
 Hart Hill Down
 Wallop Hill Down
 Mottisfont Abbey
 Roke Manor
 Lower Test nature reserve

The route

These maps show the footpath in relation to nearby major roads.  Maps are not on the same scale.

See also
 Long-distance footpaths in the UK
 North Wessex Downs Area of Outstanding Natural Beauty
 Test Way Tales (blog about walking The Test Way)

References

External links
 Hampshire County Council
 Walking on the Web 
 Ramblers Association

Footpaths in Berkshire
Footpaths in Hampshire
Long-distance footpaths in England